Mondé, or Salamãi, is a possibly extinct Tupian language of the state of Rondônia, in the Amazon region of Brazil.

Other names include Sanamaikã, Sanamaicá, Salamãi.

References

External links 
 ELAR archive of Urgently Endangered Tupian Languages (including Mondé)

Tupian languages
Endangered Tupian languages
Mamoré–Guaporé linguistic area